Arizona's 8th congressional district is a congressional district located in the U.S. state of Arizona.  It includes many of the suburbs north and west of Phoenix, in Maricopa County, Arizona. The district includes several high-income retirement communities, including Sun City West.

After redistricting for the 2012 general election, the new 8th district encompasses most of the Maricopa County portion of the old 2nd district, while most of the former 8th district became the 2nd congressional district.  It is the geographic and demographic successor of the old 2nd; while the 4th district contains most of the old 2nd's land, more than 92 percent of the old 2nd's constituents were drawn into the 8th.

This seat was vacated by Representative Trent Franks on December 8, 2017. A special election was held on April 24, 2018, and won by Republican Debbie Lesko.

History
Arizona picked up an eighth congressional district after the 2000 census. It originally encompassed the extreme southeastern part of the state. It included all of Cochise County and parts of Pima, Pinal, and Santa Cruz counties. For all intents and purposes, it was the successor to what had been the 5th district from 1983 to 2003.

Longtime Republican Jim Kolbe retired in 2007, and was succeeded by Democrat Gabby Giffords, who was shot and severely wounded at a public event on January 8, 2011. Giffords resigned her seat in January 2012. A special election that was on June 12, 2012, elected Ron Barber as the new congressman.

For the 2012 election, Barber was redistricted to the 2nd district, which includes the bulk of the old 8th district. The 8th was redrawn to include nearly all of the Maricopa County portion of the old 2nd district–as mentioned above, more than 92 percent of the old 2nd's population. The district had previously been the 3rd district from 1963 to 2003. That district's congressman, Republican Trent Franks, won the election for the new 8th.

Complete results in presidential elections 

John McCain, the 2008 Republican nominee, was also a resident of Arizona and one of the state's two United States Senators.

List of members representing the district 
Arizona began sending an eighth member to the House after the 2000 Census.

Complete election results

2002

2004

2006

2008

2010

2012 (special)

2012

2014

2016

2018 (special)

2018

2020

2022

See also

Arizona's congressional districts
List of United States congressional districts
2018 Arizona's 8th congressional district special election

References

External links
Demographic information at census.gov
2004 Election data at CNN.com
2002 Election data from CBSNews.com
Maps of Congressional Districts first in effect for the 2002 election
Maps for the 2012 election
 

08
Government of Maricopa County, Arizona
Glendale, Arizona
Peoria, Arizona
Phoenix, Arizona
Surprise, Arizona
Gabby Giffords
Constituencies established in 2003
2003 establishments in Arizona